Anthrax War is a 2009 documentary film about the 2001 anthrax attacks  and the  rise of today's biomilitary industrial complex that was co-produced by the Canadian Broadcasting Corporation and Arte-France. Broadcast internationally, it was nominated for the 2009 Prix Europa  for Outstanding Current Affairs Broadcast. It also screened at the Frontline Club in London, the IDFA Festival in Amsterdam, the Tri-Continental Film Fest in Johannesburg, and the 9/11 Film Festival  in Oakland, California, among other venues.

Filmmakers Bob Coen and  Eric Nadler also wrote the accompanying book Dead Silence that discusses, in greater detail, the investigation that the documentary examines.

Shortly after the 9/11 terrorist attacks, anthrax-laced letters were mailed to offices of media outlets in New York City and Florida, and to the U. S. Senate in Washington DC, creating an atmosphere of fear across the United States and beyond. The filmmakers question the official story surrounding the FBI investigation of this instance of biological terrorism.

References

External links
 
 

2009 films
2009 documentary films
American documentary films
Documentary films about terrorism
2001 anthrax attacks
2000s English-language films
2000s American films